Lara McDonnell (born 7 November 2003) is an Irish actress. She starred as the alternating titular role in the West End production of Matilda the Musical from 2015 to 2016. She has since landed roles in a number of films. McDonnell appeared on the 2021 Irish Independent list of actors to go stellar.

Early life and education 
McDonnell is from the Luttrellstown area of Castleknock, a suburb west of Dublin. The eldest of three to parents Hazel and Ciaran, she has a sister and a brother. McDonnell attended St Brigid's National School, Castleknock. She took after school drama classes at a parish centre near her school.

Career 
McDonnell made her first acting appearance in 2014, playing an adolescent Rosie in the romantic comedy-drama film Love, Rosie. The following year, she was cast as one of four girls playing Matilda Wormwood in the West End musical Matilda the Musical. After this, McDonnell played a young Anne Brontë in To Walk Invisible (2016) and then as Alannah in The Delinquent Season (2018).

She then played Captain Holly Short in Kenneth Branagh's Artemis Fowl (2020), a Disney film based on the novel of the same name by Eoin Colfer. Following the release of the trailer, McDonnell's casting drew some criticism as Holly is described in the book as having "nut-brown skin", leading to accusations of whitewashing. McDonnell would work with Branagh again on his film Belfast (2021), playing Moira.

In 2022, she appeared in the Channel 5 drama The Holiday as Lucy. The same year, she also appeared in the Netflix series The Last Bus. McDonnell is set to star in the upcoming film Greatest Days.

Acting credits

Film

Television

Stage

References

External links 

Living people
2003 births
21st-century Irish actresses
Irish child actresses
Irish musical theatre actresses
People from Castleknock
Actresses from County Dublin
People from County Dublin
People from Fingal
Irish film actresses
Irish television actresses